Speed Angels (Chinese:极速天使) is a 2011 Chinese action film directed by Jingle Ma.

Plot
Taxi driver Xiaoyi (Tang Wei) is discovered by a race car coach and becomes a member of the racing team Speed Angels.

Cast
 Tang Wei as Hong Xiaoyi
 Rene Liu as Han Bing
 Han Jae-suk as Gao Feng
 Jimmy Lin as Joe
 Cecilia Cheung as Yu Mei (special appearance)
 Cheng Pei-pei as Xiaoyi's mother

References

External links
 

Films directed by Jingle Ma
2011 action films
2011 films
Chinese action films
Chinese auto racing films